The 13th Annual Nickelodeon Kids' Choice Awards was held on April 15, 2000, at the Hollywood Bowl in Los Angeles, live on Nickelodeon, with around 17,000 in attendance at the venue. Rosie O'Donnell hosted for the fifth consecutive year, along with LL Cool J, David Arquette, Mandy Moore, and Frankie Muniz as co-hosts. The  show featured a SpongeBob SquarePants short to introduce the Favorite Cartoon nominees and announce the winner.

Over 15 million voters cast ballots for the ceremony, including for ten online-only categories.

Performers
 Goo Goo Dolls - "Broadway" & "Slide"
 Jennifer Lopez - Intro: "Let's Get Loud", "Feelin' So Good"
 *NSYNC - "Bye, Bye, Bye"
 Jessica Simpson & Nick Lachey - "Where You Are"

Winners and nominees
Winners are listed first and in boldface.

Movies

Television

Music

Sports

Others

Hall of Fame
 Rosie O'Donnell

References

External links
 

Nickelodeon Kids' Choice Awards
Kids' Choice Awards
Kids' Choice Awards
Kids' Choice Awards
2000 in Los Angeles